Kalamoto is a village of the Lagkadas municipality. Before the 2011 local government reform it was part of the municipality of Kallindoia. The 2011 census recorded 501 inhabitants in the village. Kalamoto is a part of the community of Nea Kallindoia.

See also
List of settlements in the Thessaloniki regional unit

References

Populated places in Thessaloniki (regional unit)